Manfred is a fairly common German forename (given name) of Alemannic origin, being derived from man (man) and fridu (peace, security), meaning "man of peace".

Manfred is also an 1816–1817 poem by Lord Byron. Other usages include:

Surname 
Frederick Manfred (1912–1994), American Western novelist
Rob Manfred (born 1958), American lawyer and sports executive; Commissioner of Major League Baseball from January 2015 to present

Given name 
Manfred of Gallura, first Judge of Gallura, c.1020–c.1040
Manfred, King of Sicily (1232–1266), King of Sicily from 1258 to 1266
Manfred I, Marquess of Saluzzo (died 1175), Italian leader, first marquess of Saluzzo
Manfred II, Marquess of Saluzzo (1140–1215), Italian leader, second marquess of Saluzzo
Manfred III, Marquess of Saluzzo (died 1244), Italian leader, third marquess of Saluzzo
Manfred IV, Marquess of Saluzzo (died 1330), Italian leader, fifth marquess of Saluzzo
Manfred of Athens (1306–1317), infante of Sicily
Manfred V, Marquess of Saluzzo Italian leader, marquess of Saluzzo 1330–1332, usurper 1341–1342
Czernin, Count Manfred Beckett (1913–1962), Austrian aviator
Count Manfred von Clary-Aldringen (1852–1928), Austro-Hungarian nobleman and statesman
Manfred Beer (born 1953), East German biathlete
Manfred Binz (born 1965), German footballer
Manfred Bischoff (born 1942), German businessman
Manfred Böckl (born 1948), German writer
Manfred Burgsmüller (1949–2019), German footballer
Manfred Dikkers (drummer)
Manfred Donike (cyclist, born 1933)
Manfred Eicher (born 1943), German record producer
Manfred Eigen (1927–2019), German biophysical chemist
Manfred Feher, Austrian table tennis player
Manfred Gerstenfeld (1937–2021), Austrian-born Israeli writer
Manfred Kaltz (born 1953), German footballer 
Manfred Kanther (born 1939), German politician 
Manfred Krug (1937–2016), German actor and singer  
Manfred Mann (musician) (born 1940), South Africa-born British keyboard player
Manfred Misselhorn (born 1938), German rower
Manfred Moore (1950–2020), American football player
Manfred von Richthofen (1892–1918), German World War I ace, the "Red Baron"
Manfred Rommel (1928–2013), mayor of Stuttgart, son of Erwin
Manfred Schumann (born 1951), West German bobsledder
Manfred Winkelhock (1951–1985), German racing driver
Manfred Wolke (born 1943), German boxer
Manfred Wörner (1934–1994), German politician and diplomat

Culture 
Manfred (Schumann), 1852 incidental music by Robert Schumann, based on the Byron poem
Manfred Symphony, 1885 symphony by Pyotr Ilyich Tchaikovsky
Manfred Mann, British beat, rhythm and blues and pop band of the 1960s
Manfred Mann's Earth Band, British progressive rock group
The Manfreds, British pop group
Manfred, a woolly mammoth in the Ice Age animated films; see List of Ice Age characters

Other 
Manfred (horse), a notable Australian Thoroughbred race horse.

See also
Manfreda
Manfredonia
Manfreid
Monfreid (disambiguation)